Beamrider is a fixed shooter written for the Intellivision by David Rolfe and published by Activision in 1983. The game was ported to the Atari 2600 (with a slightly reduced feature set), Atari 5200, Atari 8-bit family, ColecoVision, Commodore 64, ZX Spectrum, and MSX.

Gameplay

Beamrider takes place above Earth's atmosphere, where a large alien shield called the Restrictor Shield surrounds the Earth.  The player's objective is to clear the Shield's 99 sectors of alien craft while piloting the Beamrider ship.  The Beamrider is equipped with a short-range laser lariat and a limited supply of torpedoes.  The player is given three at the start of each sector.

To clear a sector, fifteen enemy ships must be destroyed.  A "Sentinel ship" will then appear, which can be destroyed using a torpedo (if any remain) for bonus points.  Some enemy ships can only be destroyed with torpedoes, and some must simply be dodged.  Occasionally during a sector, "Yellow Rejuvenators" (extra lives) appear.  They can be picked up for an extra ship, but if they are shot they will transform into ship-damaging debris.

Activision offered a Beamrider patch to players who could get to Sector 14 with 40,000 points and sent in a screenshot of their accomplishment.

Reception
The Deseret News in 1984 gave the ColecoVision version of Beamrider three stars, describing it as "basically a slide-and-shoot space game."

A reviewer for Your Commodore described the Commodore 64 version of the game as "a really good, wholesome arcade zapping game."

See also

List of Activision games: 1980–1999
 Radar Scope (1979)
 Juno First (1983)

References

External links
Beamrider for the Atari 2600 at Atari Mania
Beamrider for the Atari 8-bit family at Atari Mania

1983 video games
Fixed shooters
Atari 2600 games
Atari 5200 games
Atari 8-bit family games
ColecoVision games
Commodore 64 games
Intellivision games
MSX games
ZX Spectrum games
Activision games
Video games developed in the United States